Arkadiusz Jakubik (born 14 January 1969 in Strzelce Opolskie) is a Polish actor, scriptwriter, voice actor and musician. Known mainly for portrayal of a disabled cop Rysio in 13 posterunek sitcom and for wide collaboration with Wojciech Smarzowski. A 1992 graduate of Ludwik Solski Academy for the Dramatic Arts – Faculty in Wrocław. In 2008 he founded and became the vocalist of a rock band Dr Misio.

Selected filmography
13 posterunek 2 (1999–2000) – Aspirant Rysio
Codzienna 2 m. 3 (2005–2007) – janitor Leon
Jesteś Bogiem (2012) – Gustaw
The Wedding (2004) – notary Janocha
Piąty Stadion (2012) – Jarek 'Pele' MalakThe Dark House (2009) – Edward ŚrodońClergy (2018) – Priest Andrzej KukułaLife Feels Good (2013) – Paweł RosińskiThe Snow Queen (2013) - OrmThe Mighty Angel (2014) – TerroristVolhynia (2016) – Maciej SkibaBreaking the Limits (2017) – swimming pool managerTraffic Department'' (2012) – Senior Sergeant Bogdan Petrycki

References and external links
 
 Filmweb.pl profile

1969 births
Living people
Polish male actors
21st-century Polish male singers
21st-century Polish singers
Polish rock singers